Eversmann's hamster (Allocricetulus eversmanni) is a species of hamster in the family Cricetidae, and is one of two members of the genus Allocricetulus. It has been named after the Russian naturalist, zoologist, and explorer Eduard Friedrich Eversmann. It is endemic to Kazakhstan.

References

Mammals described in 1859
Endemic fauna of Kazakhstan
Allocricetulus
Mammals of Central Asia
Taxonomy articles created by Polbot